Cicero Ricardo de Souza (born October 3, 1978 in Serra Talhada) is a Brazilian footballer, also known as Ricardinho, currently plays for Sampaio Corrêa Futebol Clube.

He began his career with Brazilian team Sport Club do Recife of Campeonato Brasileiro Série A and in 2004 after seven years the club he was bought by Portuguese team F.C. Paços de Ferreira but only could manage 12 games with no goals and then was transferred back to Brazil to popular Brazilian team Botafogo and was there for two years and after good performances was bought buy Brazilian giants Vasco Da Gama and after one year was bought again by F.C. Paços de Ferreira for the second time in 2006.Since 2006 when arriving to F.C. Paços de Ferreira he has only managed to play 18 games in a year and a half.

Club career

Career statistics

Last update:  13 December 2010 

 Assist Goals

External links
 CBF

1978 births
Living people
Brazilian footballers
Sportspeople from Pernambuco
Association football forwards
Brazilian expatriate footballers
Sport Club do Recife players
F.C. Paços de Ferreira players
Botafogo de Futebol e Regatas players
CR Vasco da Gama players
Marília Atlético Clube players
Brasiliense Futebol Clube players
Rah Ahan players
Salgueiro Atlético Clube players
Sampaio Corrêa Futebol Clube players
Serra Talhada Futebol Clube players
Campeonato Brasileiro Série A players
Campeonato Brasileiro Série B players
Primeira Liga players
Persian Gulf Pro League players
Campeonato Brasileiro Série C players
Campeonato Pernambucano players
Campeonato Brasileiro Série D players
Brazilian expatriate sportspeople in Portugal
Brazilian expatriate sportspeople in Iran
Expatriate footballers in Portugal
Expatriate footballers in Iran